The French Red Cross, or the CRF, is the national Red Cross Society in France founded in 1864 and originally known as the Société française de secours aux blessés militaires (SSBM). Recognized as a public utility since 1945, the French Red Cross is one of the 191 national societies of the International Red Cross and Red Crescent Movement. It has more than 62,000 volunteers and 17,000 employees.

History

Leaders 
Société de Secours aux blessés militaires (SSBM)
 1864–1869: Anatole de Montesquiou-Fezensac
 1869–1870: Charles-Marie-Augustin de Goyon
 1870–1873: Maurice de Flavigny
 1873–1886: Duc de Nemours
 1887–1893: Patrice de Mac-Mahon
 1893–1897: Duc d'Aumale
 1897–1903: Léopold Davout d'Auerstaedt
 1903–1916: Melchior de Vogüé
 1916–1918: Louis Renault
 1918–1932: Paul Pau
 1932–1940: Edmond de Lillers

Comité des Dames de la Société de Secours aux blessés militaires (CDSSBM)
 1867–1869: Madame la maréchale Niel
 1869–1883: Comtesse de Flavigny
 1883–1889: Princesse Czartoriska (fille du duc de Nemours)
 1889–1898: Élisabeth de Mac Mahon
 1898–1907: Duchesse de Reggio
 1907–1923: Comtesse d'Haussonville
 1923–1926: Magdeleine Guillemin (1853-1930), marquise de Montebello
 1926–1939: Inès de Bourgoing
 1939–1940: Mlle d'Haussonville

Association des Dames de France (ADF)
 1879: Dr. Duchaussoy. Vice-President: Coralie Cahen.
 1880–1906: Countess Foucher de Careil
 1907–1913: Madame l'amirale Jaurès
 1913–1925: Madame Ernest Carnot
 1925–1940: Comtesse de Galard
 From 1940: Madame Maurice de Wendel

Union des Femmes de France (UFF)
 1881–1906: Madame Koechlin Schwartz
 1906–1921: Madame Suzanne Pérouse
 1921–1927: Madame Henri Galli
 1927–1938: Madame Barbier Hugo
 1938–1940: Madeleine Saint-René Taillandier

French Red Cross
 1940–1941: Pr. Louis Pasteur Vallery-Radot
 1941–1942: Pr. Bazy
 1942–1944: Gabriel de Mun
 1944–1945: Jacques de Bourbon Busset
 1945: Pr. Louis Justin Besançon (vice-president) Louis Milliot)
 1946–1947: Médecin Général Inspecteur Sice
 1947–1955: Georges Brouardel
 1955–1967: André François-Poncet
 1967–1969: Raymond Debenedetti
 1969–1978: Marcellin Carraud
 1979–1983: Jean-Marie Soutou
 1984–1989: Louis Dauge
 1989–1992: Georgina Dufoix
 1992—1994: André Delaude
 1994–1997: Pierre Consigny
 1997–2003: Pr. Marc Gentilini
 2004–2013: Pr. Jean-François Mattei
 2013-2021: Pr. Jean-Jacques Eledjam
 2021-2022: Philippe Da Costa

References

External links 
French Red Cross - IFRC
Official Red Cross Web Site 

Red Cross and Red Crescent national societies
1864 establishments in France
Organizations established in 1864
Medical and health organizations based in France